Dusolina Giannini (December 19, 1902 – June 29, 1986) was an Italian-American soprano, particularly associated with the Italian repertory.

Biography

Born into a musical family in Philadelphia, Giannini was the daughter of Italian tenor Ferruccio Giannini (1868-1948), who came to the United States in 1885, and with whom she first studied, later studying with Marcella Sembrich in New York. Her mother was the violinist Antonietta Briglia. She began in concert in 1923, in New York, also appearing in England. She made her stage debut in Hamburg, as Aida and Santuzza, later appearing in Berlin, Vienna, London. She sang at the Salzburg Festival in 1934, as Donna Anna and Alice Ford, and made her debut at the Paris Opéra in 1936, as Donna Anna. In 1938, she created, in Hamburg, the role of Hester Prynne in The Scarlet Letter, an opera composed by her brother Vittorio Giannini (1903-1966).

She sang at the Metropolitan Opera from 1935 to 1942, also appearing at the Chicago City Opera Company (1938–42) and the San Francisco Opera (1939–43). She also took part in the first season of the New York City Opera in 1943, as Tosca. After the war, she continued appearing in Paris, London, Berlin, and Vienna, and then turned to teaching, notably in Zurich.

Giannini's voice was a true dramatic soprano, backed by strong temperament and fine musicianship. She can be heard on a complete recording of Aida from 1928, opposite Aureliano Pertile.

Giannini's sister, Eufemia Giannini-Gregory, was a respected voice teacher at the Curtis Institute of Music in Philadelphia and taught Frank Guarrera, Judith Blegen and Anna Moffo.

Giannini died in Zurich on June 29, 1986, at the age of 83.

References

Sources

 Le Guide de l'opéra, les indispensables de la musique, R. Mancini & J.J. Rouvereux, (Fayard, 1986), 
 Grove Music Online, Max de Schauensee, Oxford Press University, April 2008.
 
 
 

1902 births
1986 deaths
20th-century American women opera singers
American operatic sopranos
Musicians from Philadelphia
American people of Italian descent
American expatriates in Switzerland
Singers from Pennsylvania
Classical musicians from Pennsylvania